Fran Čubranić (born 11 June 1997) is a Croatian professional water polo player.

 He is currently playing for VK Primorje. He is 6 ft 3 in (1.90 m) tall and weighs 209 lb (95 kg).

References

External links

 Fran Čubranić on Instagram
 Juniori nastavljaju ovogodišnji niz fenomenalnih vaterpolskih uspjeha 
 FRAN ČUBRANIĆ PROGLAŠEN ZA NAJBOLJEG GOLMANA SVIJETA NA JUNIORSKOM PRVENSTVU

1997 births
Living people
Croatian male water polo players